Mirche Atsev, or Mirče Acev, nicknamed Orovchanets, was a Bulgarian revolutionary from Ottoman Macedonia, a leader of an Internal Macedonian-Adrianople Revolutionary Organization (IMARO) revolutionary band.

Biography

Mirche Atsev was born in 1859 in the village of Oreovec in the Prilep district, then part of the Ottoman Empire. He was named after his father, Mirche Atsev, who was a well-known voyvoda. He schooled himself in Prilep and then he worked as a shepherd. After Turks murdered his father, he joined the Hayduk's band of Kone Pavlov in 1885. However, in the next year, he was arrested and imprisoned in Solun. After having escaped from the prison, Atsev moved to Bulgaria. During his stay in Sofia, he was accused of involvement in the murder of Stefan Stambolov, as a result of which he was imprisoned for three years in the Black Mosque, (now Sveti Sedmochislenitsi Church). In Sofia, together with his brothers Petar and Georgi, he joined the revolutionary activity of the IMARO against the Turkish authorities. In 1899, Atsev entered with a revolutionary band into Ottoman Macedonia, in the region of Nevrokop. Later, he was a voyvoda in the region in Prilep. In 1901, on the way to the village of Ulanci, in the Tikveš region, his band was chased and crushed by a Turkish military detachment. Mirche Atsev died in this battle.

The Yugoslav partisan Mirče Acev was a nephew of Mirche Atsev, on his brothers' side.

References

Sources
 Енциклопедия България, том 1, Издателство на БАН, София, 1978.
  Кратка биография на Мирче Ацев

1859 births
1901 deaths
Bulgarian revolutionaries
Members of the Internal Macedonian Revolutionary Organization
19th-century Bulgarian people
Prisoners and detainees of the Ottoman Empire
Bulgarian people imprisoned abroad
Macedonian Bulgarians